The Careless Age is a 1929 American pre-Code drama film directed by John Griffith Wray and written by Harrison Macklyn and Harold Shumate. It is based on the 1927 play Diversion by John Van Druten. The film stars Douglas Fairbanks Jr., Carmel Myers, Holmes Herbert, Kenneth Thomson, and Loretta Young. The film was released by Warner Bros. on September 15, 1929.

Synopsis
A noted London surgeon sends his medical student son away to Italy for a break. While in Como he falls in love with an English actress and becomes obsessed with her. Back in Britain, she jilts him for another man and in his fury he tries to kill her.

Cast       
Douglas Fairbanks Jr. as Wyn
Carmel Myers as Rayetta 
Holmes Herbert as Sir John
Kenneth Thomson as Owen 
Loretta Young as Muriel
George Baxter as Le Grand
Wilfred Noy as Lord Durhugh
Doris Lloyd as Mabs
Ilka Chase as Bunty
Raymond Lawrence as Tommy

Box Office
According to Warner Bros records the film earned $266,000 domestically and $145,000 foreign.

References

External links
 
 

1929 films
1920s English-language films
1929 drama films
First National Pictures films
Lost American films
Films directed by John Griffith Wray
American black-and-white films
Films set in London
Films set in Italy
1929 lost films
Lost drama films
1920s American films